Tupinambis matipu is a species of lizard in the family Teiidae. It is endemic to Brazil.

References

Tupinambis
Reptiles described in 2018
Taxa named by Marcélia Basto da Silva
Taxa named by Marco Antônio Ribeiro Jr.
Taxa named by Teresa C.S. Ávila-Pires